Jacques Dupre House may refer to:

Jacques Dupre House (Jarreau, Louisiana), listed on the National Register of Historic Places in Pointe Coupee Parish, Louisiana
Jacques Dupre House (Opelousas, Louisiana), formerly listed on the National Register of Historic Places in St. Landry Parish, Louisiana